This is a list of Cruzeiro E.C. managers both past and present.

A

B

C

D
  Dorival Júnior–2007–

E
  Émerson Leão–2004

F

G

H

I

J

K

L
  Luiz Felipe Scolari–2000–2001

M

N

O
  Oswaldo de Oliveira–2006

P
  Paulo Autuori de Mello–1997, 1999-2000 & 2007
  Paulo César Gusmão–2006

Q

R

S

T

U

V
  Vanderlei Luxemburgo–2002–2004

W

X

Y

Y
  Yustrich–1977

Z
  Zezé Moreira–1976